Godfrey of Brabant (died July 11, 1302 in Kortrijk), was Lord of Aarschot, between 1284 and his death in 1302, and Lord of Vierzon, between 1277 and 1302.

Biography
Godfrey was the third son of Henry III, Duke of Brabant and Adelaide of Burgundy, Duchess of Brabant. He was an able warrior and politician and supported his elder brother John I, Duke of Brabant in all his undertakings. He fought alongside his brother in the Battle of Worringen in 1288, where he captured Reginald I, Count of Guelders.

On October 29, 1284, his father made him Lord of Aarschot.  This reestablished a dynasty that had been broken in 1172 when Godfried III, Count of Aarschot, sold his county and, as a result, his heritage, to Godfrey's great-grandfather Godfrey III, Count of Louvain.  The transaction was for an unknown amount of money and an equally unknown reason.

In 1292, he negotiated a peace between France and the Count of Flanders. After the death of his brother, he supported his nephew John II of Brabant against all internal and external opposition.

In 1302, when Flanders revolted against King Philip IV of France, Godfrey and his only son joined the army of his French ally in the Battle of the Golden Spurs. Both were killed, as were many more knights of Brabant. His estates were divided among his four married daughters.

Marriage and children 
He married in 1277 Jeanne Isabeau dame de Vierzon (died 1296), daughter of Hervé IV, Lord of Vierzon, and Jeanne de Brenne. They had 1 son and 6 daughters :
 Jean (1281–1302), killed in the Battle of the Golden Spurs.
 Marie (died 1332), married to Walram, Count of Jülich (died 1297), and then to Robert of Beaumont.
 Elisabeth (died 1350), married to Gerhard V of Jülich (died 1328).
 Alix (died 1315), married in 1302 to John III of Harcourt (died 1329).
 Blanche (died 1329), married to Jean Berthout, Lord of Mechelen (died 1304), and in 1307 to  John I of Thouars (died 1332).
 Marguerite, nun at Longchamps, Paris, died after 1318
 Jeanne, nun at Longchamps, Paris, died after 1318

Ancestry

Sources 

Medieval Lands Project, Dukes of Brabant

Belgian nobility
1302 deaths
1250 births